Kʼinich Kan Bahlam II, also known as Chan Bahlum II, (May, 635 - February, 702) was ajaw of the Maya city-state of Palenque. He acceded to the throne in January, 684, several months after the death of his father and predecessor, Kʼinich Janaab Pakal I and ruled until his death.

Biography
He continued the ambitious project of adorning Palenque with fine art and architecture begun by his father; his most important addition to the city of Palenque was the Temple of the Cross which is the center piece of the Temple of the Cross Complex. He was succeeded by his younger brother, Kʼinich Kʼan Joy Chitam II, another brother was probably Tiwol Chan Mat. The monuments and text associated with Kʼinich Kan Bahlam II are: Tablets and Alfardas of the Temples of the Cross, Sun and Foliated Cross; tablets and facade of the Temple of the Inscriptions; Temple 17 Panel; Death's Head; Jonuta Panel; Temple of the Cross Stela.

Notes

Footnotes

References

635 births
702 deaths
Rulers of Palenque
7th-century monarchs in North America
7th century in the Maya civilization